María Pons may refer to:

María Antonieta Pons (1922–2004), Cuban-born Mexican dancer, actor, and singer
María José Pons (born 1984), Spanish footballer
María Magdalena Campos Pons (born 1959), Cuban-born American artist and arts educator